Boom Town is a structured-reality television and comedy sketch show series produced by independent company Knickerbockerglory for BBC. It first aired on BBC Three in August and September 2013. Directed by Hannah Springham and produced by Jonathan Stadlen, the series features a cast of eccentrics playing their own alter-egos, including their "own catchphrases, eccentricities and larger than life personalities".

Concept
If all of Britain's most eccentric real-life people lived in the same place, then that town would be called "Boom Town". Everyone who appears in the show is completely real, featuring their real lives, passions and dialogue which are all their own.

However, some of the scenes have been "enhanced" for viewers' entertainment, and the way that the scenes are cut together pushes strongly on the conventions of a comedy sketch show.

Main stars

Production
The series is scheduled to comprise six 30-minute episodes, produced by Jonathan Stadlen for Knickerbockerglory. It was commissioned for BBC Three by Zai Bennett, Controller and Karl Warner, Executive Editor, Entertainment of BBC Three. After commissioning a pilot in April 2012, Warer commented:

Although the residents may come from distinct parts of the UK, most of the scenes for many of them were shot in studios or contracted outside set locations, mostly in Southwest London.
Outside the UK, Boom Town will be distributed by ITV Studios Global Entertainment, which showcased the series at MIPTV Media Market in Cannes, France, in April 2013.

Reception

Critical reception
After commissioning a pilot in 2012, a year before its transmission, Paul Jensen, writing for Chortle, called Boom Town "the last straw" for his time of watching BBC Three. In its own review of episode 1, Chortle compared the programme to Channel 4's failed similar comedy project Kookyville, which, after the pilot was slated by critics, was not commissioned for a full series. Simon Horsford, writing for The Daily Telegraph, commented: "(it's) the kind of pointless series you might find on Channel 5 or E4 (in its bad days). Described as 'structured reality', Boom Town follows/mocks a collection of 'real-life' eccentrics." Yolanda Zappaterra for Time Out commented: "If you liked Fonejacker and You've Been Framed! you may like this, in which some very strange people use their own scripted dialogue in 'enhanced' scenes to create set-ups that range between uncomfortable viewing and a smile."

Ratings
Episode viewing figures from BARB.

References

External links

 

2013 British television series debuts
2013 British television series endings
2010s British comedy television series
BBC television comedy
British reality television series
BBC television sketch shows
Television shows set in London
English-language television shows